Rated R: Republicans in Hollywood is a 2004 American documentary about politically conservative members of Hollywood and explores whether they face discrimination.

Appearances
The documentary includes interviews with filmmakers and actors including 
 Drew Carey
 Lionel Chetwynd
 Vincent Gallo
 Patricia Heaton
 Michael Medved
 John Milius
 Ivan Reitman
 Pat Sajak
 Douglas Urbanski

Production and release
Created and narrated by former Democratic speech writer Jesse Moss, the documentary explores the conservative side of Hollywood, interviewing actors, producers, and filmmakers.

The documentary premiered on AMC on September 14, 2004.

Reception

The film received a modest reception from critics.

References

External links

Documentary films about American politics
Documentary films about Hollywood, Los Angeles
2004 films
2000s English-language films
2000s American films